Nuclear is a Chilean thrash metal band founded in Arica, Chile, in 1998. The band has gone through several lineup changes and is currently signed to the label Candlelight Records.

History
Nuclear was formed in 1995 under the name Escoria, but it was not until 1997 when the first recording was released. After the dissolution in 2001, the name of Escoria turned to Nuclear and the original members Sebastian Puente, Francisco and Eugene Haussmann Sudy are maintained in a constant line up that continues to date.

The band has released four studio albums and toured in several countries sharing the stage with acts like Testament, Forbidden, Voivod, Grave, Hirax, 1349, Anthrax, Destruction, Witchcraft, Hate Eternal, Absu, At the Gates among others.

During 2013, the band released their first live DVD called Sick Mosh and Inner Hate, a split vinyl, which were put in launching and distributed by the Chilean label Sick Bangers.

Tour and constant releases of the band caught the attention of British label Candlelight Records, and in 2014 signed the band for future releases. And on 15 June 2015 the band released their fifth studio album entitled Formula for Anarchy.

Band members

Current members
Matías Leonicio – lead vocalist
Francisco Haussmann – guitar
Sebastian Puente – guitar
Eugenio Sudy – drum
Roberto Soto – bass

Former members
Raimundo Correa – bass
Álvaro Castillo – bass

Discography

Studio albums
Heaven Denied (2006)
Ten Broken Codes (2008)
Jehovirus (2010)
Apatrida (2012)
Formula for Anarchy (2015)

Live albums
Mosh Detonation (2009)
Live at Teatro Novedades (2012)
Live at Obscene Extreme Bootleg (2014)
XVII SWR Barroselas Live Bootleg (2014)

Demo
Promo Tape (1997)
Demo (1998)

DVD
Chilean Most Wanted (2008)
Sick Mosh (2014)

References

External links

Official website
Nuclear on Candlelight Records

Musical groups established in 1998
Chilean heavy metal musical groups
Chilean thrash metal musical groups
Crossover thrash groups
Candlelight Records artists